Erika Sema and Yurika Sema were the defending champions, however, they chose not to participate.

Jessica Moore and Abbie Myers won the title, defeating Naiktha Bains and Karolina Wlodarczak in an all-Australian final, 6–4, 6–0.

Seeds

Draw

References 
 Draw

Bendigo Women's International (1) - Doubles